William C. Morris is a town in Buenos Aires Province, Argentina. It forms part of the Greater Buenos Aires metropolitan area and is located in the Hurlingham Partido.

Name 
The town is named to honor Englishman William Case Morris (16 February 1864 – 15 September 1932), Methodist, educator and founder of the first Methodist Chapel in Argentina. He arrived in Argentina as a ten-year-old youth with his widowed father, and eventually founded a series of children's shelters in Buenos Aires. He returned to England shortly before his death.

References

External links

Populated places in Buenos Aires Province
Hurlingham Partido
Cities in Argentina